Officers is a World War II real time strategy game developed by 3A Games and published by Tri Synergy. It was released on 28 November 2008 in Japan, 29 May 2009 in Europe and released in the USA on 14 July 2009 for Windows.

Gameplay & Plot 
Officers is set in World War II and it allows players to take control of Allied forces which consist of US and British Armies in a fight for control over Western Europe against Germany.
The game has over 50 units and it lets players use real military formation tactics with units. Furthermore, the game also contains a map editor which allows players to create custom scenarios.

Reception 
Metacritic gave the game a 66/100 rating, based on 9 critic reviews. GameSpot gave the game a 5.5/10 rating, based on 8 critic reviews.

External links & References 
Gamespot review
Metacritic review
Official Website

2008 video games
2009 video games
Real-time strategy video games
Video games developed in Russia
Windows games
Windows-only games
World War II video games
Tri Synergy games